Studvest is a weekly student newspaper published in Bergen, Norway with a circulation of 8,500. It covers the three large institutions the University of Bergen, Bergen University College and the Norwegian School of Economics and Business Administration as well as small colleges such as Bergen National Academy of the Arts and Bergen School of Architecture. The newspaper is published by a volunteer editorial office subordinate to the Student Welfare Organisation in Bergen.

The first edition was published on November 20, 1945 under the name Ånd og Vilje. In 1961 it changed name to Stud.Vest, that was later shortened to the present Studvest. Ånd og Vilje was primarily a debate forum, and came in a normal newspaper format first in 1973. It became a weekly publication in 1995.

References

1945 establishments in Norway
Bergen University College
Newspapers established in 1945
Newspapers published in Bergen
Norwegian School of Economics
Student newspapers
University of Bergen